Morrell is a surname, and may refer to:

 Andy Morrell (born 1974), English footballer
 Arthur Fleming Morrell (1788-1880), English naval captain and explorer
 Arthur R.H. Morrell (1878–1968), a Deputy Master of Trinity House
 Benjamin Morrell (c. 1795–1838 or 1839?), American sealing captain and explorer
 Bill Morrell (1893-1975), American Major League Baseball pitcher
 Cynthia Hedge-Morrell (born 1947), American educator and politician, wife of Arthur Morrell
 Cyril Morrell, English rugby league footballer of the 1930s
 Daniel Johnson Morrell (1821-1885), American politician
 David Morrell (born 1943), Canadian novelist
 Dawn Morrell (born 1949), American politician
 Digby Morrell (born 1979), former Australian rules footballer 
 Douglas Wellesley Morrell (1917-1996), British electrical engineer 
 Edith Alice Morrell, possible victim of suspected serial killer John Bodkin Adams
 Edward Morrell (1868–1946), American Old West train robbery accomplice and prison reform advocate
 E. D. Morel (1873–1924) British journalist, anti-war activist, whistleblower
 Edward de Veaux Morrell (1863-1917), American politician
 Frances Morrell (1937-2010), British politician
 Galya Morrell (born 1961), artist and explorer
 Geoff Morrell (actor) (born 1958), Australian actor
 Geoff Morrell (spokesperson) (born 1968), American reporter and Pentagon spokesman
 George Morrell (football manager) (1872-after 1915), Scottish football manager
 George Herbert Morrell (1845–1906), English politician
 George Truman Morrell (1830–1912), British naval officer and explorer
 Gladys Morrell (1888–1969), Bermudian suffragette
 Glen E. Morrell, United States Sergeant Major of the Army from 1983 to 1987
 John Bowes Morrell (1873–1963), English author, historian and twice Lord Mayor of York
 John Morrell (rugby league), rugby league footballer of the 1920s
 Jack Morrell (historian of science), University of Leeds, England
 Jack Morrell (boxer) (born 1955), American boxer
 Jemima Morrell (1832–1909), English traveller and illustrator
 Lloyd Morrell (1907–1996), Anglican bishop
 Jessica Page Morrell, American writer 
 Jill Morrell (born 1957), girlfriend of and campaigner for the release of kidnapped journalist John McCarthy
 Joe Morrell (born 1997), Welsh footballer
 Jonathan Morrell, British television and radio presenter
 Jules or Julie Morrell (died 1911), New York gangster
 Leslie Morrell (born 1931), former Northern Ireland unionist politician
 Michael Morell (born 1958), former deputy director and acting director of the Central Intelligence Agency
 Mike Morrell (born 1952), American politician
 Nidia Morrell (born 1953), Argentine astronomer
 Lady Ottoline Morrell (1873-1938), English aristocrat and society hostess
 Paul Morrell, English quantity surveyor and the UK Government's first Chief Construction Adviser (2009-2012)
 Paul Morrell (footballer) (born 1961), former English footballer
 Philip Morrell (1870-1943), British politician
 Sean Morrell (born 1986), Fijian rugby union player
 Thomas Baker Morrell DD FRSE (1815-1877) Bishop of Edinburgh
 William Parker Morrell (1899–1986), New Zealand historian and professor

See also
 Morrel (a family name in The Count of Monte Cristo)